Koopman's pencil-tailed tree mouse (Chiropodomys karlkoopmani) is a species of arboreal rodent in the family Muridae. It is endemic to Pagai and Siberut islands in the Mentawai Islands, off the western coast of Sumatra in Indonesia.
Its natural habitat is tropical primary lowland forest. It is threatened by habitat loss (logging).

References

Chiropodomys
Rats of Asia
Endemic fauna of Indonesia
Rodents of Indonesia
Fauna of Sumatra
Mentawai Islands Regency
Vulnerable fauna of Asia
Mammals described in 1979
Taxonomy articles created by Polbot